Rustem Rinatovich Kanipov (born 22 January 1982) is a former Russian professional football player.

Club career
He played two seasons in the Russian Football National League for FC Rubin Kazan and FC Sokol Saratov.

References

External links
 

1982 births
Footballers from Kazan
Living people
Russian footballers
Association football defenders
FC Rubin Kazan players
FC Sokol Saratov players
FC Rotor Volgograd players
FC Mordovia Saransk players
FC Zenit-Izhevsk players
FC Oryol players
FC Volga Ulyanovsk players